The 2022 Georgia Swarm season is the 6th season of the Georgia Swarm, a lacrosse team based in Duluth, Georgia playing in the National Lacrosse League. The team was formerly based in Saint Paul, Minnesota and was known as the Minnesota Swarm.

Regular season

Current standings

Game log
game18_ot=1

Roster

Entry Draft
The 2021 NLL Entry Draft took place on August 28, 2021. The Swarm made the following selections:

References

Georgia Swarm
Georgia Swarm
Georgia Swarm seasons